The Black Star Gate is part of the Independence Square now known as the Black Star Square in Accra. It is located at the center of the Square where parades are held. The Black Star Gate is a monument topped by the Black Star of Africa. The five-pointed star represents Africa in general and particularly Ghana itself. It has the inscription “AD 1957” and “Freedom and Justice”.
The Black Star Gate was commissioned by  Kwame Nkrumah  to indicate the country's supreme power to control its own affairs.

References 

Buildings and structures in Accra
Monuments and memorials in Ghana